Baeckea latens is a species of flowering plant in the family Myrtaceae and is endemic to the south of Western Australia. It is an upright, spreading shrub with erect, linear leaves and small white flowers with three to ten stamens.

Description
There are three to ten stamens arranged opposite the sepals.

Taxonomy
Baeckea latens was first formally described in 1904 by Cecil Rollo Payton Andrews in the Journal of the West Australian Natural History Society from a small fragment collected north of Esperance in October 1903.

In 2021, Barbara Lynette Rye changed the name to Austrobaeckea latens, but the name has not yet been accepted by the Australian Plant Census.

Distribution and habitat
This baeckea grows in a range of habitats with mallees, on undulating plains and hills and in winter-wet places from near Kukerin to the Cape Arid National Park in the Esperance Plains and Mallee biogeographic regions of southern Western Australia.

See also
List of Baeckea species

References

Flora of Western Australia
latens
Plants described in 1904
Taxa named by Cecil Rollo Payton Andrews